The Convent of Ibrahim Al Khalil ( Arabic: دير إبراهيم الخليل) is a Melkite Greek Catholic Convent located in Kashkul Jaraman, 8 km east of Damascus, Syria. The Convent contains a Church, Health Center, Dormitory, computer lab, and child care facility.

History 

The convent was initiated by Al Assaf family in the 90s. With the support of the Patriarchy in Damascus and many Christian families the convent was extended and started offering various services free of charge. After the war in Iraq in 2003, and under the leadership of Soeur Malake Arbach, the Convent served a big number Iraqi refugees. The Center offered free meals and health care for thousands of people

Health Center 

The Charity Health Center of the Convent is a Medical Center with eight clinics of various specializations and a pharmacy. The center offer health care and medications free of charge for the general public regardless of religion, ethnicity, or nationality. 62 doctors volunteer to rotate on the Clinics of the Health Center. It received support from UNHCR and other organizations 
. With their support the Center was able to acquire modern medical equipments which are not available in the poor suburb of Damascus.

Dormitory 
The dormitory contains 50 rooms. It is designated for students and convent visitors.

Kinder care 

The kinder care is child care facility consisting of five class rooms, three shared rooms, and three administrative rooms. The facility has a capacity of 80 aged between three and seven years of age.

References

Melkite Greek Catholic Church in Syria
1990 establishments in Syria
Convents in Asia
Religious buildings and structures in Syria